Ratari may refer to the following places in Serbia:

 Ratari (Obrenovac), a village in the municipality of Obrenovac, city of Belgrade 
 Ratari (Smederevska Palanka), a village in the municipality of Smederevska Palanka